Eurobeat refers to two styles of dance music that originated in Europe: one is a British variant of Italian Eurodisco-influenced dance-pop, and the other is a hi-NRG-driven form of Italo disco. Both forms were developed in the 1980s.

Producer trio Stock Aitken Waterman and pop band Dead or Alive made Eurobeat music more popular in the United States, where Eurobeat was historically marketed as hi-NRG (pronounced as "high energy"). For a short while, it also shared this term with early freestyle music and Italo disco.

Overview
In the late 1970s, Eurodisco musicians such as Silver Convention and Donna Summer were popular in America.

In the 1980s, a highly polished production with "musical simplicity" at its core — from Bubblegum Pop-like lyrics, catchy (in some cases Italian, in other Eurodisco-like) melodies, to "elementary" song structures — an average British Eurobeat song took very little time to complete. Bananarama's "Venus" and Mel & Kim's "Showing Out (Get Fresh at the Weekend)" were said to be completed in a day, according to Pete Waterman of Stock Aitken Waterman.

Eurobeat lyrics and melody are very simple. Italo disco, sometimes fast and happy music like EDM, with a sequenced octave bassline. Many feature guitars as a beginning section, followed by a thunderous, highly technical synthesizer riff which is then repeated after the chorus. Songs usually repeat the verse, bridge, and chorus multiple times during the song. The beginning is typically like an instrumental rendition of the verse, bridge, and chorus, while the riff is a lot like an instrumental version of the chorus.

Use of the term
British record producer Ian Levine's Eastbound Expressway, released the single "You're a Beat" in recognition of the slower tempo of hi-NRG music emerging from Europe. Many European acts managed to break through under this new recognition, namely the likes of Modern Talking, Bad Boys Blue, Taffy, and Spagna. The term "Eurobeat" was subsequently used commercially to describe the Stock Aitken Waterman–produced hits by Dead or Alive, Bananarama, Jason Donovan, Sonia, and Kylie Minogue which were heavily based on the British experience with Italo disco. During 1986–1988, it was used for specific Italian 1980s Eurodisco imports, such as Sabrina Salerno, Spagna, and Baltimora but was also used in the United States as a catch-all term for UK-based dance and electropop groups of the time such as Pet Shop Boys, purported to have a "European beat", hence Eurobeat. By 1989, with the advent of Eurodance and Euro house, the term was dropped in the UK.

History

United Kingdom

The trio of British record producers, songwriters, and former DJs Mike Stock, Matt Aitken, and Pete Waterman were involved in the British underground club culture, encountering the Black American soul music-focused scene called Northern Soul, Italian pop-Eurodisco, and sped-up Motown Sound-inspired tracks. As underground record producers, they sought to recapture the "nostalgia" of Motown Sound with a hint of campy playfulness where the simplicity of musical structures, like in Italian disco, was preferred. This musical formula was proven to be successful enough to be capitalized on as they had a string of top 10 UK hits in the 1980s to the point of their version of Eurobeat becoming synonymous with British pop music as a whole.

Pete Burns of Dead or Alive regularly fought the production team over "[having to adhere] to their production methods and concepts" which SAW were "quite firm about". Burns went on making a next album, produced by Burns and Dead or Alive drummer Steve Coy, without them, called Nude. Epic (licensed by Sony Europe) was reluctant about releasing the album but it turned out to be so successful in Japan that it was awarded the Japan Record Award Grand Prix for Best International Album of 1989 in the 'Pop' or 'Popular' Category.

Italy and Japan

"By the Italians, for the Japanese"

Meanwhile, in Japan in 1985, the term "Eurobeat" was applied to all continental-European dance music imports. These were mainly Italian and German-produced Italo disco releases. That sound became the soundtrack of the Para Para nightclub culture, which has existed since the early 1980s. Japan experienced Italo disco through the success of the German group Arabesque, which broke up in 1984. This did not prevent the release of two Italo disco-sounding singles in 1985 and 1986, produced and mixed by Michael Cretu (of Enigma). The later solo success of Arabesque's lead singer Sandra further introduced this sound to Japan. This attracted the attention of many Italo disco producers (mostly Italians and Germans), though by the late 1980s the Germans had faded out of Italo disco and focused on more popular scenes, mainly trance. In Japan, this music is called "Eurobeat", "Super Eurobeat", and "Eurobeat Flash".

The Japanese Para Para dance culture is influenced by Eurobeat.
In the early 1990s, Eurobeat's popularity was gradually decreasing in Japan. Two Japanese men, namely Masato "Max" Matsuura the owner and a managing director of Avex a small import record shop at the time, decided to release a compilation CD. They went to Italy and met Giancarlo Pasquini (later known as Dave Rodgers), then a member of the Italo disco band Aleph. Together they released the second Super Eurobeat compilation in 1994 reissuing versions of the first compilation released by Beat Freak Label in 1990, a compilation CD which saw instant success and re-ignited Eurobeat's popularity in Japan. Avex also collaborated with foundational Eurobeat labels A-Beat C, Time, and Delta long after Eurobeat's mainstream popularity peak.

Eurobeat's sound (in the Japanese market) is its main link to its Italo disco origins, where it was just one of many different experiments in pure electronic dance. There are certain synth instruments that recur across the entire genre: a sequenced octave bass, the energetic (sometimes wild) and heavy use of synths, distinctive brass and harp sounds, and tight, predictable percussion in the background. 

The anime series Initial D, based on the manga by Shuichi Shigeno, uses Eurobeat music regularly in its episodes during racing scenes between the characters, and because of this it has come to the attention of some anime fans outside Japan. The series, as well as the video games, use a large playlist of Eurobeat songs (for example, the trio of "Deja Vu" by Dave Rodgers, "Running in the 90s" by Max Coveri, and "Gas Gas Gas" by Manuel Caramori). (Many of these songs also became memes.) There are also many Eurobeat songs based on the series itself, including: "Takumi" by Neo, "Speed Car" by D-Team, "Initial D Hell" by Dave Rodgers and "DDD Initial D (My Car is Fantasy)" by Mega NRG Man. Another anime called Dear Boys, which focuses on basketball, also features Eurobeat during basketball game sequences.

In 1998, Bemani, a branch of the video game company Konami made a hit video dance machine, Dance Dance Revolution. The game acquired Eurobeat songs from the Dancemania compilation series published by Toshiba EMI. Though there was not much Eurobeat from 2006's SuperNOVA on, the series still features some tracks as of 2021. Other music games in Konami's lineup feature a large number of Eurobeat tracks, including Beatmania, Beatmania IIDX, jubeat, and many more. The popularity of the genre also led Konami to create a Para Para game, ParaParaParadise, though it was less successful than their other series.

J-Euro

There have been four types of music called "J-Euro" (Japanese Eurobeat);
1. Eurobeat songs made in Italy, covered by Japanese artists with Japanese lyrics.
This type of "J-Euro" appeared first in the early 1990s. Notable artists of this type of "J-Euro" have included MAX, D&D, V6, Dream, and the "Queen of J-pop" Namie Amuro.

2. J-pop songs made in Japan, remixed in the style of Eurobeat by Italian Eurobeat producers.
This type of "J-Euro" appeared first on the 1999 issue of Super Eurobeat, Vol. 100, with several tracks of this type of "J-Euro" by MAX, Every Little Thing, and Ayumi Hamasaki. This type of "J-Euro" has been popular in the para para scene since around 2000. Avex Trax launched the Super Eurobeat Presents : J-Euro series in 2000. This series included Ayu-ro Mix 1, 2 and 3, plus a fourth remix album missing the "Super Eurobeat" tag featuring Ayumi Hamasaki, Euro Every Little Thing featuring Every Little Thing, Hyper Euro MAX featuring MAX, Euro global featuring globe, Euro Dream Land featuring Dream, J-Euro Best, J-Euro Non-Stop Best, etc.
3. Eurobeat songs made in Japan, and sung by Japanese artists themselves.
 This type of Eurobeat has always been present since the 2000s, but only started to gain attention once the para para scene began promoting songs in this style. Most songs are anime remixes or J-pop covers, which has led to some calling it an anime boom.
Eurobeat labels that showcase this type of J-Euro are A-One, Akiba Koubou INC/Akiba Records, Eurobeat Union, Fantasy Dance Tracks, Plum Music, Sound Holic, SuganoMusic, TTL Sound, Takanashi Koubou and more.

Para Para

See also
List of Eurobeat artists
Super Eurobeat
Eurobeat Disney
Initial D
Italo disco

References

 
1980s in music
1990s in music
2000s in music
European music genres
Hi-NRG
British styles of music
Italian styles of music
Japanese styles of music
Okinawan music
Culture in Okinawa Prefecture
Electronic dance music genres